The 1995 National League Championship Series (NLCS), the second round of baseball's 1995 National League playoffs, matched the East Division champion Atlanta Braves against the Central Division champion Cincinnati Reds. The Reds had the home field advantage due to a predetermined formula which awarded home field advantage to the Central Division champion or its playoff opponent. 

The two teams were victorious in the NL Division Series (NLDS), with the Braves defeating the wild card qualifier Colorado Rockies three games to one, and the Reds defeating the West Division champion Los Angeles Dodgers three games to none. The Braves won the series four games to none to become the National League champions, and defeated the American League champion Cleveland Indians in the 1995 World Series.

This NLCS was notable as it matched up what had been the two easternmost teams in the National League West Division from 1969–1993, both teams having been placed there at the insistence of the New York Mets and Chicago Cubs (the former team wanted the Cubs' rivals St. Louis Cardinals, then the dominating power of the NL, in the National League East Division, and the Cubs wanted in the same division as St. Louis). It was also the first NLCS since 1989 not to feature either the Philadelphia Phillies or the Pittsburgh Pirates. The two teams reigned exclusively as NL East champions from 1990 to 1993.

Summary

Cincinnati Reds vs. Atlanta Braves

Game summaries

Game 1
Tuesday, October 10, 1995, at Riverfront Stadium in Cincinnati, Ohio

The opening game of the 1995 NLCS would be well-pitched and decided in extra innings. The only run allowed by Tom Glavine, who would go seven innings, came on a Ron Gant single following a Barry Larkin triple in the fourth. Pete Schourek was lights out the entire game, but allowed back-to-back leadoff singles in the ninth before David Justice hit into a forceout at second to send the game to extra innings. In the 11th inning, bench player Mike Devereaux singled in Fred McGriff, who drew a leadoff walk off of Mike Jackson and moved to third on two groundouts, to give Atlanta a 2–1 lead. Manager Bobby Cox needed to use three pitchers in the bottom of the inning, but Greg McMichael induced a double play with runners on first and third that ended the game.

Game 2
Wednesday, October 11, 1995, at Riverfront Stadium in Cincinnati, Ohio

With John Smoltz on the mound, the Braves took an early 1–0 lead when Marquis Grissom hit a leadoff single in the first off of John Smiley, moved to second on a groundout and scored on Chipper Jones's single, then got a second run in the fourth when Fred McGriff hit a leadoff double and scored on a Mike Devereaux RBI double. In the fifth, Lenny Harris's two-out RBI single with two on put the Reds on the board, then Jeff Branson stole home to tie the game at two. That score held until the tenth inning, when the Braves scored four runs and took the game. Cincinnati reliever Mark Portugal's wild pitch with the bases loaded allowed Mark Lemke to scamper home with the go-ahead run. Javy López followed with a three-run blast that blew the game open. This would be the final postseason game ever played in Riverfront Stadium.

Game 3
Friday, October 13, 1995, at Atlanta–Fulton County Stadium in Atlanta, Georgia

Greg Maddux went eight innings and only gave up one run in another strong start for an Atlanta starter. Lefty David Wells, acquired by Cincinnati in anticipation of facing the predominantly left-handed Braves lineup in the playoffs, matched Maddux with a scoreless first five innings. Later, right-handed Atlanta catcher Charlie O'Brien belted a three-run home run in the sixth off Wells. Rookie Chipper Jones hit a two-run shot in the seventh to make it 5–0. The Reds got on the board in the eighth on three straight one-out singles, the last of which to Hal Morris scoring a run. Mark Wohlers earned the save in the ninth despite allowing a leadoff double to Jeff Branson, who moved to third on a groundout and scored on Thomas Howard's sacrifice fly, as the Braves held on for a 5–2 victory.

Game 4
Saturday, October 14, 1995, at Atlanta–Fulton County Stadium in Atlanta, Georgia

Steve Avery, who was inconsistent all season, got the start for Atlanta and tossed six scoreless innings. Rafael Belliard hit a leadoff single off of Pete Schourek in the third, then moved to second on a fly out before Mark Lemke hit an RBI single to give Atlanta a 1–0 lead. The game remained close until the seventh, when Mike Jackson allowed a leadoff triple and one out walk before a passed ball allowed Marquis Grissom to score. After an intentional walk, series MVP Mike Devereaux hit a three-run home run to put the Braves up 5–0. After a double and intentional walk, Dave Burba relieved Jackson and Luis Polonia's RBI single made it 6–0 Braves. Bobby Cox took no chances and used closer Mark Wohlers to finish off the Reds in the ninth. The shutout victory completed a surprisingly easy sweep of Cincinnati and sent the Braves to their third World Series in five years.

The Reds offense only managed to score five runs in four games off Atlanta's pitching staff, even with the fact that the first two contests went to extra-innings.

This was the only NLCS to end in a four-game sweep until 2007, when the Colorado Rockies defeated the Arizona Diamondbacks in four games.

Former Brave Ron Gant would play against his former team with the Reds, then again the next year as a member of the St. Louis Cardinals. 

This was the final game for manager Davey Johnson with the Reds.

Composite box
1995 NLCS (4–0): Atlanta Braves over Cincinnati Reds

Aftermath
Two weeks after sweeping the Reds, the Braves won the franchise's third World Series and their first in Atlanta, beating the Cleveland Indians in six games.

In one of the more awkward situations in MLB history, Reds owner Marge Schott announced early in the 1995 season that manager Davey Johnson would not return in 1996, regardless of how the Reds did. Schott named former Reds third baseman Ray Knight (who had played for Johnson on the '86 Mets championship team) as bench coach, with the understanding that he would take over as manager in 1996. This might have been a surprise to the rest of baseball world, but it was not in Cincinnati as Schott and Johnson had a poor relationship even from the start of Johnson's tenure as Reds manager in 1993. The Reds took a dive under Ray Knight in 1996 and he was eventually fired in 1997. Johnson was quickly hired to manage the Baltimore Orioles for the 1996 season, but would find himself in another tenuous situation, as he and Orioles owner Peter Angelos would not get along. Similar to his situation with Marge Schott, Johnson would be fired after the 1997 season despite two AL Championship Series appearances. Meanwhile, Schott was banned from day-to-day operations of the Reds by MLB from 1996 through 1998 due to statements in support of German domestic policies of Nazi Party leader Adolf Hitler, amongst other controversies over her own personal beliefs; shortly afterwards, she sold the majority of her share in the team in 1999.

The Reds promptly floundered for the next fifteen years, missing the playoffs each year until 2010. The Reds also have not won a postseason series in October since beating the Dodgers to advance to the NLCS in 1995, which is the currently second longest postseason series winning drought in MLB.

Atlanta would sweep Cincinnati again in the National League Wild Card Series in 2020.

References

External links
1995 NLCS at Baseball Reference

National League Championship Series
Atlanta Braves postseason
Cincinnati Reds postseason
National League Championship Series
National League Championship Series
National League Championship Series
National League Championship Series
1990s in Cincinnati
National League Championship Series
Baseball competitions in Atlanta
Baseball competitions in Cincinnati